ELA-4, is a launch pad and associated facilities at the Centre Spatial Guyanais in French Guiana located along the Route de l'Espace in the Roche Christine site, between ELA-3 and ELS launch facilities. The complex is composed of a launch pad with mobile gantry, an horizontal assembly building and a dedicated launch operations building. ELA-4 is operated by Arianespace as part of the Ariane 6 program.  the first launch is scheduled for the fourth quarter of 2023.

History 
CNES was responsible for the construction of the Ariane 6 ground segments including the new launch pad. Earthworks on the 170 hectare launch site began at the end of June 2015 and was completed at the start of 2016. Four platforms were levelled to accommodate the launch pad, the liquid oxygen and hydrogen tanks and the assembly building. Civil engineering works on the flame trench and other buildings began in the summer of 2016 and ended in 2019. The launch facility was inaugurated on 28 September 2021 in presence of most of the 600 workers employed at the site, 75% of which recruited locally.

Scheduled flights

See also 

 Ariane 6
 Ariane (rocket family)
 ELA-1
 ELA-2
 ELA-3
 ELS
 Centre Spatial Guyanais

References 

Guiana Space Centre